is a Japanese Buddhologist and Tibetologist. He is an emeritus professor at the University of Tokyo, where he also took his doctorate degree in Sanskrit in 1954. He also studied in Paris and for many years was a researcher at the Tōyō Bunko. He retired in 1986.

Zuiho Yamaguchi specializes in the history of Tibet and studied include the manuscripts of Dunhuang, but also dealt with other subjects, such as the Tibetan calendar which he published a work in 1973 in Japanese. He also did a thorough investigation of facts surrounding emperor Langdarma, where he challenged the assertion that Langdarma was a persecutor of Buddhism and a supporter of Bon.

Works

マハーバーラタものがたり 青葉書房, 1957 (学級図書館)  
オーレル・スタイン蒐集チベット語文献解題目録 2冊組、東洋文庫,　1977-78  
吐蕃王国成立史研究, 岩波書店, 1983  
チベットの仏教と社会　春秋社, 1986
 
 
チベット語文語文法  春秋社, 1998  
「概説」チベット語文語文典 春秋社, 2002 
「要訣」チベット語文語文典 成田山新勝寺成田山仏教研究所, 2003
「評説」インド仏教 哲学史　岩波書店, 2010

Translations

チベットの文化 R.A.スタン 定方晟共訳 岩波書店, 1971 (増補版 1993)

Essays
 CiNii>山口瑞鳳
 INBUDS>山口瑞鳳

References 
 福田洋一「日本のチベット学10年—山口瑞鳳博士の研究を中心に」『仏教学』36, 1994

University of Tokyo alumni
Academic staff of the University of Tokyo
1926 births
Living people
Tibetologists
Japanese scholars of Buddhism